Epiphyllum hybrids, epiphyllums, epicacti, or just epis, also known as orchid cacti, which are widely grown for their flowers, are artificial hybrids of species within the group of cacti placed in the tribe Hylocereeae. In spite of the common name, epiphyllum hybrids mainly involve Disocactus species instead of Epiphyllum species, though Selenicereus grandiflorus and some unconfirmed Epiphyllum species were reportedly used for hybridization. Other sources include Pseudorhipsalis in the parentage of the group.

Nothospecies 
Named nothospecies include:
 Disocactus × amaranthinus (Regel) M.H.J.van der Meer: D. crenatus × D. phyllanthoides
 Disocactus × charltonii (Mast.) M.H.J.van der Meer: D. crenatus × D. speciosus
 Disocactus × coopermannii (Worsley) M.H.J.van der Meer: D. crenatus × D. phyllanthoides × D. speciosus
 Disocactus × jenkinsonii (McIntosh) M.H.J.van der Meer (syn.: Disocactus × hybridus (Van Geel) Barthlott): D. phyllanthoides × D. speciosus
 Disocactus × kimnachii G.D.Rowley (syn.: Nopalxochia × horichii Kimnach): probably D. crenatus × D. phyllanthoides, therefore possibly synonymous with D. × amaranthinus

As horticultural literature often confuses D. ackermannii with D. × jenkinsonii, the following two names of nothospecies are dubious:
Disocactus × hansii (Baumann) M.H.J.van der Meer (syn.: Disocactus × violaceus (F.Sm. & T.Sm.bis ex Mast.) Barthlott): D. ackermannii × D. speciosus
Disocactus × splendens (Regel) M.H.J.van der Meer: D. crenatus × D. ackermannii

History 
The parent species from which epiphyllum hybrids were bred are different in appearance and habit from most cacti. They are found in the tropical forests of Central America where they grow as climbers or on trees as epiphytes. They have leafless (or apparently leafless) flattened stems which act as the plant's photosynthetic organs. Relatively large flowers are borne on the sides of the stems; in many species they open at night.

The Epiphyllum Society of America (the International Registration Authority for hybrids of the Tribe Hylocereeae) maintains a list of epiphyllum hybrids (and Hylocereeae species) which contained over 7,000 names in 1996.

Cultivation

Epiphyllum hybrids need different treatment from semi-desert cacti. They should be protected from direct sunlight, with preferably 75% shading at midday. They are not frost hardy, so need to be protected from freezing conditions. It is recommended that the growing medium allows rapid drainage of water and is open, with at least one third of coarse material to prevent compaction. Plants should be kept moist. High nitrogen fertilizers are not recommended; no fertilizer should be given during the winter rest period.

Propagating epiphyllum hybrids from cuttings is said to be easy. Rooting hormone can be applied to the base of the cutting before it is allowed to dry for ten days or more so that the cut forms a callus. The cutting is then planted sufficiently deeply so that it can stand upright. Water is not given for two weeks, after which the growing medium is kept at least slightly moist. Plants can be misted. They are fast growing plants and should flower within two years.  Epiphyllum hybrids should be re-potted every 2 to 3 years as they tend to sour and deplete the nutrients in their growing medium.  Because the plants are aggressive and grow quickly, they are susceptible to depleting the potassium in their growing medium which results in older growth failing to remain turgid and shriveling.  They should be provided a balanced fertilizer when in active growth to prevent the older growth from shriveling.  Flowering is triggered by withholding water and giving the plants a dry resting period of about two months during their winter rest.

References

External links
 Epiphyllum Society of America - the International Registration Authority for epiphytic cactus hybrids of the Tribe Hylocereeae

Epiphyllum
Hybrid plants